"I'm in a Hurry (And Don't Know Why)" is a song written by Roger Murrah and Randy VanWarmer, and recorded by American country music band Alabama.  It was released in September 1992 as the second single from their album American Pride.  The song hit number one on both the US Billboard Hot Country Songs chart and the Canadian RPM Country Tracks chart.

Content
The song is an up-tempo, in which the narrator discusses the rather fast pace of the current society. He states that he is always in a hurry, but has no explanation as to why he is rushing.

Chart positions

Year-end charts

Certifications

Cover version
Florida Georgia Line covered the song on the 2013 album Alabama & Friends. This version peaked at number 47 on Hot Country Songs and number 82 on the Canadian Hot 100.

Popular culture 
"I'm in a Hurry (And Don't Know Why)" is featured in the first episode of the miniseries The Dropout, based on Elizabeth Holmes and the Theranos scandal. Holmes had named "I'm in a Hurry (And Don't Know Why)" as her favorite song in high school.

References

External links
 

1992 singles
Alabama (American band) songs
Songs written by Roger Murrah
Songs written by Randy VanWarmer
Song recordings produced by Josh Leo
Music videos directed by Deaton-Flanigen Productions
RCA Records Nashville singles
Florida Georgia Line songs
1992 songs